ASAB or Asab may refer to:

 Asab, a settlement in Nambia
 Assigned Sex At Birth
 Atlanta and St. Andrews Bay Railroad, a class I railroad which operated in Alabama and Florida